Rev. Michael Lionel Plaskow MBE (born 8 July 1936 in Tel Aviv, Mandate Palestine (now Israel)).

He was Minister at Woodside Park Synagogue, 1956–2000, and served for over 40 years in the same synagogue in the United Synagogue.  He was Chaplain to the Mayor of Barnet, 1999–2000.  He was an Honorary Grand Chaplain of the Freemasons, and received the 1992 Norman B. Spencer award for research into Freemasonry.  He became a Freeman of the City of London in 1994 and received an MBE in 1998.

He was also a mohel.  He estimated that he performed nearly 2000 circumcisions, including several on sons of babies he had circumcised early in his career.

Being born in Palestine, he has always regarded himself as a Palestinian Jew.  He has retired to Netanya.

References
 Jewish Year Book 2005, p. 285
 Woodside Ark (magazine of Woodside Park Synagogue), 1998 issues.

Living people
British Orthodox rabbis
Orthodox rabbis in Mandatory Palestine
1936 births
Members of the Order of the British Empire